"All I Need" is a song by American actor and singer Jack Wagner. The song was released in 1984 from his debut album with the same name.

Wagner became known for his role as Frisco Jones on the soap opera General Hospital prior to recording the song; he has since had roles on other television programs, such as The Bold and the Beautiful and Melrose Place. "All I Need" was written by Glen Ballard, David Pack and Clif Magness and produced by Ballard and Magness.

The song proved to be Wagner's only Top 40 hit, peaking at number two on the Billboard Hot 100 chart in early 1985, remaining there for two weeks, behind Madonna's "Like a Virgin". In Canada, "All I Need" reached number three.  The single also spent two weeks atop Billboard's adult contemporary chart, as well as the Canadian AC chart.

Chart history

Weekly charts

Year-end charts

Cover versions
 In 2007, the song was covered by Filipino rock band Shamrock for the Filipino romantic comedy movie My Best Friend's Girlfriend.
 In 2009, VH1 ranked "All I Need" No. 71 on its program 100 Greatest One-Hit Wonders of the 80s.

See also
List of number-one adult contemporary singles of 1985 (U.S.)

References

External links
Single release info at discogs.com

1984 debut singles
Jack Wagner (actor) songs
Songs written by Glen Ballard
Songs written by David Pack
Pop ballads
Rock ballads
Songs written by Clif Magness
1984 songs
Qwest Records singles